Tu Jong-sil is a former international table tennis player from North Korea.

Table tennis career
She won two silver medals for North Korea at the 1997 World Table Tennis Championships and 2001 World Table Tennis Championships in the Corbillon Cup (women's team event).

She represented North Korea during the 1996 Olympic Games.

See also
 List of World Table Tennis Championships medalists

References

North Korean female table tennis players
1978 births
Living people
Asian Games medalists in table tennis
Table tennis players at the 1998 Asian Games
Medalists at the 1998 Asian Games
Asian Games silver medalists for North Korea
World Table Tennis Championships medalists
Olympic table tennis players of North Korea
Table tennis players at the 1996 Summer Olympics
20th-century North Korean women